Mechinagar is a municipality in Jhapa District, Koshi Pradesh, Nepal and is the main entry point from India on Nepal's eastern border.  Nepal's custom office is in Kakarvitta, a section of the municipality. The city is almost 475 km south east of the capital city Kathmandu and 115 km east of the state capital of Province One Biratnagar.

Origin 

Mechinagar municipality initially originated by combining Dhulabari and Kakarbhitta Village Development Committee. The municipality got its first territorial expansion by getting merged with nearby VDCs Bahundangi, Duhagadhi, Jyamirgadhi and Dhaijan in 2073 BS (2017 AD). The population of the expanded city is 131,520 (as of the 2021 census) and its area is 192.52 sq. km. The municipality is the municipality with the highest population in the country.

Geographical status 

The city lies in the most eastern part of Nepal. The city is the largest municipality in the Jhapa District. The city has Arjundhara Municipality and Birtamod in the Western Part, Buddha Shanti Gaupalika and Ilam District in the North, Bhadrapur, Mechi in the South and West Bengal, India in the East. Mechi River separates City and Nepal from India.

Two major highways Mahendra Highway & Mechi Highway run in the city. The city is the link between the Northern Mechi Zone for the rest of the nation. The nearest airport is Bhadrapur Airport which is just attached to the Southern part of the city. Daily 6-8 flights make it to Kathmandu two way from the Airport.

Ward Division 

Previously the city was divided in 13 wards. The city divided in 15 wards after expansion. The following are the new ward division:

Local Election

Local Level Election 2017 
Mechinagar Municipality is in the Jhapa district of Pradesh 1. There are 90,202 eligible voters for the Nepal local elections 2017, according to the Election Commission. There are 15 wards in the metropolitan city with a population of 111,520.

 Total Population : 111,520
 Number of Wards : 15
 Election Center : 35
 Number of Male Voters : 45,112
 Number of Female Voters : 45,090
 Number of Other Voters : -
 Total Eligible Voters : 90,202

Mayoral election 

|-
! colspan="2" style="text-align:centre;" | Party
! style="width: 108pt;" |Candidate
! style="width: 40pt;" |Votes
! style="width: 30pt;" |%
|-
| style="background-color:;" |
| style="text-align:left;" |Nepali Congress
| style="text-align:left;"|Bimal Acharya  
|20,776 
|41.61% 
|-
| style="background-color:;" |
| style="text-align:left;" |CPN (Unified Marxist–Leninist)
| style="text-align:left;"|Bishnu Prasad Prasain
|19,192
|38.79% 
|-
| style="background-color:darkred;" |
| style="text-align:left;" |Communist Party of Nepal (Maoist Centre)
| style="text-align:left;"|Hand Lal Rajbanshi 
|7,696
|4.61%
|-
| style="background-color:gold;" |
| style="text-align:left;" | Rastriya Prajatantra Party
| style="text-align:left;"|Ramesh Dahal 
|803
|0.72%
|-
|  |
| style="text-align:left;" |Others
| style="text-align:left;"|
| 1246
| 14.27%
|-
|- 
!colspan=3 align=left|Total||49,711|| 100
|-
! colspan="3" |Result
! colspan="2" |Nepali Congress gain
|}

|-
! colspan="2" style="text-align:centre;" | Party
! style="width: 108pt;" |Candidate
! style="width: 40pt;" |Votes
! style="width: 30pt;" |%
|-
|-
| style="background-color:;" |
| style="text-align:left;" |CPN (Unified Marxist–Leninist)
| style="text-align:left;"|Mina Kumari Pokharel
|20,016
|40.42%
|-
| style="background-color:;" |
| style="text-align:left;" |Nepali Congress
| style="text-align:left;"|Durga Khatiwada 
|19,106 
|38.59%
|-
| style="background-color:darkred;" |
| style="text-align:left;" |Communist Party of Nepal (Maoist Centre)
| style="text-align:left;"|Indira karki 
|7,690
|4.56%
|-
| style="background-color:gold;" |
| style="text-align:left;" | Rastriya Prajatantra Party
| style="text-align:left;"|Sabina Bajagain
|1,235
|1.89%
|-
|  |
| style="text-align:left;" |Others
| style="text-align:left;"|
| 1246
| 14.54%
|-
|- 
!colspan=3 align=left|Total||49,711|| 100
|-
! colspan="3" |Result
! colspan="2" |CPN (UML) gain
|}

Local Level Election 2079 
Mechinagar Municipality is in the Jhapa district of Pradesh 1. There are 90,202 eligible voters for the Nepal local elections 2022, according to the Election Commission. There are 15 wards in the metropolitan city with a population of 131,520.

 Total Population : 131,520
 Number of Wards : 15
 Election Center : 35
 Number of Male Voters : 45,112
 Number of Female Voters : 45,090
 Number of Other Voters : -
 Total Eligible Voters : 90,202

Council formation

Current members

Demography
The city is majorly occupied by the Bramins & Chettris. The city also have the remarkable number of the Dhimal & Rajbanshi Inhabitants. Marwari Community have the major stake on the trading business of the city.

Climate 

The city temperature reaches up to 40 degree Celsius in the Summer and fall below 8 degrees in the winter. The city is a summer city and the winter lies only for four months (November to February). During March and April, high winds are likely to occur and moderate rainfall is seen in June & July.

Road Network 

Asian Highway 02 (AH02)
Mahendra Highway (H01)
Mechi Highway (H07) 
Bahundangi Road

References

Populated places in Jhapa District
Transit and customs posts along the India–Nepal border
Municipalities in Koshi Province
Nepal municipalities established in 1997
Municipalities in Jhapa District